Piper hederaceum, also known as the giant pepper vine, is a vine in the pepper family Piperaceae. It is endemic to eastern Australia, growing in rainforests from Lockhart River, Queensland to Bermagui, New South Wales.

Taxonomy
This species was first described in 1845 by the Dutch botanist Friedrich Anton Wilhelm Miquel, who gave it the combination Cubeba hederacea and published his description in The London Journal of Botany. It was subsequently transferred to Piper hederaceum in 1869 by the Swiss botanist Anne Casimir Pyramus de Candolle, writing in the book Prodromus Systematis Naturalis Regni Vegetabilis.

Gallery

References

External links
 
 
 View a map of historical sightings of this species at the Australasian Virtual Herbarium
 View observations of this species on iNaturalist
 View images of this species on Flickriver

hederaceum
Flora of Queensland
Flora of New South Wales
Endemic flora of Australia
Taxa named by Casimir de Candolle
Plants described in 1869